Tony Glausi, (born 1994) is an American trumpeter, keyboardist, vocalist, composer and music producer.

Biography

Early life

Glausi's initial fascination with music began at age four, often sitting at his family's piano, figuring out melodies by ear and eventually writing simple compositions.  His mother and each of his four grandparents worked as professional musicians. His earliest memories include dancing to the music his parents put on in their living room.

He picked up the trumpet at age ten, citing a love for the instrument's diverse tonal possibilities, as well as its look and feel.  Primarily studying classical music until age 16, Glausi gained exposure to jazz while a student at West Linn High School under the tutelage of music director Kevin Egan. He studied jazz performance and composition respectively as an undergraduate and later master's student at the University of Oregon in Eugene.

Upon winning the 2017 Laurie Frink Career Grant, Glausi had the opportunity to be mentored by trumpeter Wynton Marsalis.

Musical career

During his college years, Glausi performed extensively throughout the Pacific Northwest with artists including grammy-nominated pianist Randy Porter, vocalist Halie Loren, and pianist George Colligan while also leading his own quintet and 9-piece band. He recorded his debut album Identity Crisis at age twenty-one.

Glausi relocated to New York City in 2018. During this time, he began touring with pianist and singer Peter Cincotti and a wide array of young rising jazz stars, including bassist Russell Hall, keyboardist Chris McCarthy, saxophonist Julian Lee, drummer Bryan Carter, pianist Emmet Cohen and many others.

Glausi Currently serves on the faculty of the New School for Jazz and Contemporary Music in New York City.

Awards

The International Trumpet Guild honored Glausi as the winner of its 2017 ITG International Trumpet Competition.  He also garnered 1st place at the 2017 Carmine Caruso Solo International Trumpet Competition. Glausi was the winner of the 2016–17 Laurie Frink Career Grant.  He garnered First Place in 2014 National Trumpet Competition

Discography

As leader

As sideman

References

External links 

1994 births
Living people
American jazz trumpeters
American jazz singers
American jazz composers
University of Oregon alumni
21st-century trumpeters
Musicians from Eugene, Oregon
American jazz keyboardists
Record producers from Oregon
Businesspeople from Eugene, Oregon